Heathcock is another name for the partridge, a class of medium-sized non-migratory gamebirds. 

Heathcock may also refer to:

Places 
 Heathcock Peak located in the eastern part of the Caloplaca Hills in Antarctica

People 
 Alan Heathcock (born 1971), an American fiction writer whose first collection of short fiction, VOLT, was selected as an Editor's Pick for both The New York Times Book Review and The Oxford American
 Berty Heathcock (1903–1990), English footballer
 Clayton Heathcock (born 1936), an organic chemist at the University of California, Berkeley, known for his accomplishments in the synthesis of complex polycyclic natural products
 Ronald Jeffrey "Jeff" Heathcock (born 1959), a former Major League Baseball pitcher who played for the Houston Astros  in the 1980s

See also
 Hathcock